Soldiers Farewell Stage Station was a stagecoach stop of the 1858-1861 Butterfield Overland Mail route before the company moved to the central route (former Pony Express route). West of "Soldiers Farewell Hill" on the west bank of a drainage arroyo, the stop was on the Butterfield Overland Mail route (1858-1861) in Grant County, New Mexico. According to the Overland Mail Company Through Time Schedule, it was 150 miles (33½ hours) west of El Paso, Texas and 184½ miles (41 hours) east of Tucson, Arizona.  Located 42 miles east of Stein's Peak Station and 14 miles southwest of Ojo de Vaca Station.

References

External links
Street Scale map from TopoQuest (accessed July 6, 2008).
 Soldiers Farewell Stage Station, New Mexico (Locale)

History of Grant County, New Mexico
New Mexico Territory
Butterfield Overland Mail in New Mexico Territory
Geography of Grant County, New Mexico
1858 establishments in New Mexico Territory
Stagecoach stations in New Mexico